Fatal Attraction is a 1987 American psychological thriller film directed by Adrian Lyne starring Michael Douglas, Glenn Close, and Anne Archer.

Fatal Attraction or Fatal Attractions may also refer to:

Television 
Fatal Attractions (TV series), recurring American nature documentary series on Animal Planet first aired in 2010
 "Fatal Attraction", an episode of Jake and the Fatman television series
Fatal Attraction (TV series), an American television series on TV One, documenting crimes committed by people in passionate relationships
Fatal Attraction (2023 TV series), an upcoming American TV miniseries based on the 1987 film

Music 
 Fatal Attraction, a 1984 album by Adam Bomb
 Fatal Attraction, a 1990 album by Killer
 "Fatal Attraction", a song by Roxanne Shanté from the 1989 album Bad Sister
 "Fatal Attraction", a song by Anjulie from the 2009 self-titled debut album Anjulie
 "Fatal Attraction", a song by Mark Stewart from the 1987 eponymous album Mark Stewart
 "Fatal Attraction", a song by Karen Clark Sheard from the 2002 compilation album T.D. Jakes Presents: God's Leading Ladies
 "Fatal Attraction", a song by Tone Lōc from the 1991 album Cool Hand Lōc
 "Fatal Attraction", a song by Mumzy Stranger from the 2010 album Journey Begins
 “Fatal Attraction”, a song by Kevin Gates from the 2019 album I'm Him

Other uses 
 Fatal attraction, a psychological theory about the failure of interpersonal relationships
 Fatal Attractions (comics), 1993 Marvel Comics crossover storyline centered on the X-Men
 Fatal Attraction (play), a 2014 play based on the 1987 film

See also
 Salt: A Fatal Attraction, a 2006 indie film by Bradford Tatum